Kundara railway station (Code: KUV) is a railway station (NSG 6 category) in the historic industrial town of Kollam, Kundara, Kerala. Kundara railway station falls under the Madurai railway division of the Southern Railway zone, Indian Railways. The station is one of two railway stations in the industrial town of Kundara. Other one is Kundara East railway station.

Indian Railways connects Kundara with various cities in India like Kollam, Thiruvananthapuram, Kottayam, Ernakulam, Thrissur, Nagercoil, Tirunelveli, Madurai  & with various towns like Punalur, Paravur, Kottarakkara, Kayamkulam, Karunagappalli, Varkala, Neyyattinkara & Kanyakumari. The nearest railway stations are Chandanathoppe and Kundara East.

Significance
Kundara railway station has gained significance because of proximity to Kundara Ceramics Limited, Kollam Technopark, Aluminium Industries Limited (ALIND), Kerala Electrical and Allied Engineering Co. Ltd. (KEL), Lakshmi Starch Ltd., etc. All the trains passing through stop at the station.

Services

See also
 Kollam Junction railway station
 Karunagappalli railway station
 Paravur railway station
 Punalur railway station
 Kottarakara railway station

References

Kundara
Thiruvananthapuram railway division
1904 establishments in India
Railway stations opened in 1904